Colin Treharne (born 30 July 1937) is a Welsh former professional footballer who played in the Football League for Lincoln City and Mansfield Town.

References

1937 births
Living people
Welsh footballers
Association football goalkeepers
English Football League players
Mansfield Town F.C. players
Lincoln City F.C. players
Ilkeston Town F.C. (1945) players